Oscar David Smith (born November 8, 1947 in Los Angeles) is an American track and field athlete. He represented the United States in the triple jump at two Olympics, 1968 and 1972. During this period he also ran for the University of California. He was the American Indoor Champion in 1971. He was ranked #2 in the US four times, in 1968, 1970-2.

References

Living people
1947 births
American male triple jumpers
Athletes (track and field) at the 1968 Summer Olympics
Athletes (track and field) at the 1972 Summer Olympics
California Golden Bears men's track and field athletes
Olympic track and field athletes of the United States
Track and field athletes from Los Angeles
20th-century American people